Mark Felton  (born 1974) is a British historian of the Second World War and author of more than twenty books. His most recently published work is 2019's Operation Swallow: American Soldiers' Remarkable Escape From Berga Concentration Camp, which details the illegal mistreatment of U.S. prisoners of war under Nazi captivity and their struggles. He has additionally created a variety of informational online videos available on YouTube covering different historical subjects of the 20th century (including material outside of the First World War and second world conflict context, such as releases about the Cold War).

Early life and education
Felton was born in Colchester, Essex, and received his education at the Philip Morant School. Felton sat for a BA in history with English at Anglia Polytechnic University, holds a postgraduate certificate in political science, an MA in Native American studies, and a PhD in history, all from the University of Essex.

Career
Felton lectured in Shanghai, China, between 2005 and 2014, latterly at Fudan University. He also worked as a volunteer for the Royal British Legion, organising the annual Poppy Appeal in Eastern China, 2010–2014. Following a request from Prime Minister David Cameron, he assisted the British Consulate Shanghai in the rediscovery of the graves of four British soldiers killed by the Japanese in 1937, and was awarded a Royal British Legion Certificate of Appreciation.

Felton has appeared on television as a military history expert, including in the series Combat Trains (The History Channel), Top Tens of Warfare (Quest TV), and Evolution of Evil (American Heroes Channel). His book Zero Night, about an escape from a German prison camp, received much critical attention, and was the subject of the BBC Radio documentary Three Minutes of Mayhem. Zero Night has been highlighted to Essential Media for feature film development.

In 2016, Felton's book Castle of the Eagles: Escape from Mussolini's Colditz, which concerns the escape of British generals from Vincigliata Castle near Florence in 1943, was identified for feature film development by Entertainment One. Also in 2017, he was made a Companion of the Naval Order of the United States.

In October 2017, Felton started his first YouTube channel, titled Mark Felton Productions, which explores a variety of historical subjects in terms of the 20th century (including material outside of the First World War and second world conflict context, such as releases about the Cold War). For example, a July 2022 production discussed the use of 'Iron Cross' type decorations by Colombia during the nation's involvement within the United Nations' allied effort fighting during the Korean War. As well, a March 2022 production detailed the Hungarian Uprising and the results of anticommunist militant forces failing to overcome the occupying Soviet administration of Hungary in late 1956. As of February 2023, this channel has picked up 1.82 million subscribers.

On 26 November 2019, Felton created a second channel, titled War Stories with Mark Felton, on which he posts recordings of himself reading various books that he has written (usually in parts). As of February 2023, his second channel has accumulated over 300,000 subscribers.

In 2022, Felton announced that he had been elected a Fellow of the Royal Historical Society, as well as being elected to become a Fellow of the Royal Society of Arts later the same year.

Felton's most recently published work is 2019's Operation Swallow: American Soldiers' Remarkable Escape From Berga Concentration Camp, which details the illegal mistreatment of U.S. prisoners of war under Nazi captivity and their struggles. The company Center Street (of the Hachette Book Group) published the book.

Personal life
Felton lives in Norwich with his wife and son.

Bibliography
 Yanagi: The Secret Underwater Trade between Germany and Japan 1942–1945 (Pen & Sword: 2005)
 The Fujita Plan: Japanese Attacks on the United States and Australia during the Second World War (Pen & Sword: 2006)
 The Coolie Generals: Britain's Far Eastern Military Leaders in Japanese Captivity (Pen & Sword: 2008)
 Japan's Gestapo: Murder, Mayhem & Torture in Wartime Asia (Pen & Sword, 2009)
 Today is a Good Day to Fight: The Indian Wars and the Conquest of the West (The History Press, 2009)
 The Real Tenko: Extraordinary True Stories of Women Prisoners of the Japanese (Pen & Sword: 2009)
 The Final Betrayal: Mountbatten, MacArthur and the Tragedy of Japanese POWs (Pen & Sword: 2010)
 21st Century Courage: Stirring Stories of Modern British Heroes (Pen & Sword, 2010)
 Children of the Camps: Japan's Last Forgotten Victims (Pen & Sword: 2011)
 The Last Nazis: The Hunt for Hitler's Henchmen (Pen & Sword: 2011)
 The Devil's Doctors: Japanese Human Experiments on Allied Prisoners-of-War (Pen & Sword: 2012)
 Never Surrender: Dramatic Escapes from Japanese Prison Camps (Pen & Sword: 2013)
 China Station: The British Military in the Middle Kingdom 1839–1997 (Pen & Sword: 2013)
 Guarding Hitler: The Secret World of the Fuhrer (Pen & Sword: 2014)
 Zero Night: The Untold Story of World War Two's Most Daring Great Escape (Icon Books: 2014)
 The Sea Devils: Operation Struggle and the Last Great Raid of World War Two (Icon Books: 2015)
 Holocaust Heroes: Resistance to Hitler's Final Solution (Pen & Sword: 2016)
 Castle of the Eagles: Escape from Mussolini's Colditz (Icon Books: 2017)
 Ghost Riders: When US and German Soldiers Fought Together to Save the World's Most Famous Horses in the Last Desperate Days of World War II, (Da Capo: 2018)
 Operation Swallow: American Soldiers Remarkable Escape from Berga Concentration Camp (Center Street: 2019)
 Chapter 8: The Perfect Storm: Japanese Military Brutality in World War II, Routledge History of Genocide, Ed. C. Carmichael & R. Maguire, (Routledge, 2015)

References

External links 
 
 

1974 births
21st-century English historians
Alumni of the University of Essex
English military historians
English YouTubers
Academic staff of Fudan University
Historians of World War II
Living people
People from Colchester